The Research Foundation – Flanders (FWO) is a Belgian public research council, based in Brussels. The Flemish research council aims to sponsor ground-breaking research and innovation. Much of this work involves supporting researchers and undertakings in association with the universities and institutes of Flanders, including Ghent University, University of Leuven, University of Antwerp and Free University of Brussels, among others.

History 
The FWO is a successor to the Belgian National Fund for Scientific Research (NFWO / FNRS), which had been founded in 1928, after the call from King Albert I of Belgium for the promotion of research and innovation.

In 2006, the National Fund for Scientific Research (NFWO / FNRS) divided into two organisations: the FWO, for the Flemish community, and the F.R.S.-FNRS for the French-speaking region. A self-governing organization, the Research Foundation – Flanders is located in Brussels and financed by the Flemish government, the federal government, and the national lottery, with further support coming from partner institutes and companies.

Function 
The FWO supports research in science, engineering, and the humanities through a variety of frameworks. It offers competitive funding for doctoral and postdoctoral fellowships as well as for research grants, specific projects, and infrastructure. Moreover, the FWO funds international mobility and collaboration. Together with a number of partners, it also bestows scientific prizes.

Organisation

Regular funding 
The FWO organises a total of 31 expert panels, 30 specialist and one interdisciplinary. These panels advise the Senate and the Board of Trustees on matters of funding.

 Biological sciences
 Molecular and cellular biology
 Functional biology
 Biodiversity and ecology
 Applied biological sciences
 Humanities
 Languages
 Art, art history, and literature
 History and archaeology
 Theology and religious studies
 Philosophy and ethics
 Social sciences
 Sciences of law and criminology
 Economics, business economics and management
 Psychology, pedagogy, didactics, and social work
 Social, political, and communication sciences
 Medical sciences
 Pharmaceutical sciences and medical biochemistry
 Genetics, functional genome research, bio-informatics science, developmental biology
 Microbiology and immunology
 Cancer research
 Neuroscience, clinical neurology, psychiatry, musculoskeletal research, rheumatology, orthopaedics, and dermatology
 Gastroenterology, hepatology, endocrinology, metabolism and nutrition, reproduction, and urogenital system
 Health sciences
 Science and technology
 Mathematical sciences
 Physics
 Condensed matter and physical chemistry
 Chemistry
 Informatics and knowledge technology
 Chemical engineering, material sciences
 Energy, electrical engineering, electronics, and mechanics
 Sciences of the earth and space
 Science and technology of construction and the build environment
 Interdisciplinary

Special committees 
The FWO also organises special committees to advise on support for international collaboration, research infrastructure, and other special mandates.

International profile 
The FWO is a member of Science Europe and collaborates in many European research organisations.

In addition, it has created partnerships with numerous counterparts across the globe, such as the French Centre national de la recherche scientifique (CNRS), Dutch Netherlands Organisation for Scientific Research (NWO), Japan Society for the Promotion of Science, Polish Academy of Sciences, and National Natural Science Foundation of China.

Examples of projects supported

See also 
 Funding of science
 National Fund for Scientific Research

References

External links 
 
 History of the FWO

Research and development organizations
Science and technology in Belgium
Research institutes in Belgium
Research and development in Europe
Research funding agencies